"Once You Get Started" is a horn-driven funk number written by musician Gavin Christopher, and recorded and released by the band Rufus featuring Chaka Khan in late 1974. The song is led mostly by Khan, though fellow group member Tony Maiden contributed lead vocals for the song's second verse. It helped to make their third album Rufusized go platinum. "Once You Get Started", peaked at number ten on the Billboard Hot 100 in 1975, giving the group their second top ten single and third top forty single overall. The song also hit number-four on the Hot Soul Singles chart as well as  number six on the Record World, Disco File Top 20 chart.

Covers
Christopher later recorded his own version of the song on his 1986 solo album, One Step Closer. 
Chaka Khan re-recorded a version for the deluxe version of her 2007 album Funk This.
Bobby Byrd's wife now widow Vicki Anderson previously recorded a version of this song with Christopher singing background vocals released June 1974.

Samples
The song was sampled in Raw Man's 1999 song,"Number Seven".

Song in Media
It was also prominently heard in an episode of Good Times titled "Cousin Cleatus".

Credits
Chaka Khan - lead vocals; background vocals
Tony Maiden - guitar; co-lead vocals; background vocals
Kevin Murphy - keyboards; background vocals
Andre Fischer - drums; background vocals
Bobby Watson - bass; background vocals
Tower of Power - horns

References

1974 songs
1975 singles
Chaka Khan songs
Songs written by Gavin Christopher
ABC Records singles